Karol Kazimierz Kurpiński (March 6, 1785September 18, 1857) was a Polish composer, conductor and pedagogue. He was a representative of late classicism and a member of the Warsaw Society of Friends of Learning (Polish: Towarzystwo Warszawskie Przyjaciół Nauk, TWPN). He is also known for having composed the music to the 1831 patriotic song La Varsovienne with lyrics by Casimir Delavigne. He was also a mentor and an influence  on young Chopin.

Career
Born in Włoszakowice, Karol began his studies under his father, Marcin Kurpiński, an organist. At the age of 12, he became an organist at a church in Sarnowa, Konin County, near Rawicz, where his uncle Karol Wański was a parish priest. In 1800 his other uncle, the cellist Roch Wański, took him to the estate of count Feliks Polanowski near Lviv, who had a private orchestra of which Wański was a member, and in which the young Kurpiński played the violin.

There, around 1808, Kurpiński composed his first opera, Pygmalion. In 1810 he settled in Warsaw. With the help of Józef Elsner, he became a conductor of the Warsaw Opera, a position he held until 1840. He taught music at several prominent schools including one he founded. In 1815 he became a member of many musical societies in Poland and abroad, including the Société des Enfants d'Apollon in Paris. He became Kapellmeister of the Polish royal chapel in 1819 and in the same year received a lifetime achievement award for his services to music. In 1820 he founded and edited the first Polish music newsletter. He was decorated with the Order of Saint Stanislaus in 1823.

In 1829, together with Józef Elsner he was ordered by the authorities to write music for the coronation of Nicolas I of Russia for King of Poland. For this occasion Kurpiński composed Te deum. The work wasn't performed again until 2011. 

Kurpiński was a romanticist and one of the most revered composers before Chopin who he met in 1828.  He  helped to lay the foundations of a national style and prepared the ground for Polish music of the Romantic period particularly Chopin. He contributed to the development of Polish opera, introducing new musical devices and achieving a novel mode of expression.

He died on September 18, 1857, in Warsaw, aged 72.

Works, editions and recordings

Stage works 
 Pygmalion, opera (c. 1800–08) (lost)
 The Palace of Lucifer, opera in 4 acts (1811)
 Mistress Marcin of the Harem, comic opera in 3 acts (1812)
 The Charlatan, or The Raising of the Dead, opera in 2 acts (1814)
 Jadwiga, Queen of Poland, opera in 3 acts (1814)
 The Reward, or the Revival of the Polish Kingdom, melodrama in 2 acts (1815)
 Superstition, or Krakovians and Mountaineers, or The new Krakovians, opera in 3 acts (1816)
 Jan Kochanowski at Czarny Las, opera comique in 2 acts (1817)
 Czaromysl the Slav Prince, opera in 1 act (1818)
 Terpsichore's New Colony on the Vistula, ballet (1818)
 The Castle of Czorsztyn, or Bojomir and Wanda, opera in 2 acts (1819) Libretto: Józef Wawrzyniec Krasiński z Radziejowic (recording by Polska Orkiestra Sinfonia Iuventus – conducted Michał Niedziałek, with soloists Aleksandra Orłowska-Jabłońska, Hubert Stolarski, Jadwiga Niebelska, Tomasz Raff, Witold Żołądkiewicz Dux Records)
 Kalmora, or The Paternal Right of the Americans, melodrama in 2 acts (1820) libretto by Kazimierz Brodziński
 Mars and Flora, ballet in 1 act (1820)
 The Foresters of Kozienice, opera in 1 act (1821)
 The Three Graces, ballet (1822)
 Cecylia Piaseczynska, opera in 2 acts (1829)

Orchestral works 
 Grand Symphony Imagining a Battle, or The Battle of Mozhaysk Op. 15.
 Grand Fugue on the Song "Poland has not perished yet", arranged for piano (1821)
 Potpourri, or Variations on National Themes, for piano and orchestra (1822)
 Clarinet Concerto in B-flat major, arranged for clarinet and piano (1950)

Chamber music 
 Fantaisie en quatuor
 Trio, for clarinet, violin and cello
 Reverie over Wanda's tomb, for violin and piano (1820)
 Nocturne, for horn, bassoon and viola, Op. 16 (1823)
 Paysage Musical, for horn and bassoon, Op. 18 (1823)
 Cavatina, for trumpet or trombone and piano (1953)

Piano music 
 A Dreadful Dream (1820)
 Le reveil de J.J. Rousseau au printemps (1821)
 Nine variations (1821)
 Fantaisie for alto (1821)
 Fantaisie, Op. 10 (1823)
 Six Variations (1823)

Vocal works

Sacred 
 Six Masses, including "Country Mass" (1821)
 Oratorio, for 4 voices, 2 trumpets, 2 trombones, double bass, timpani and organ,
Te deum laudamus (1829).

Cantata 
 Cantata on the Anniversary of Napoleon's Coronation (1810)
 Elegy on the Death of Tadeusz Kosciuszko (1819)
 Cantata on the Unveiling of the Copernicus Monument (1830)

Songs 
 The Song of Warsaw (1831)
 The Song of the Lithuanian Legionaries (1831)

References

External links
 Works by Karol Kurpiński in National Digital Library of Poland (Polona)
"Karol Kurpiński", Polish Music Center

1785 births
1857 deaths
19th-century classical composers
19th-century male musicians
Male conductors (music)
Male opera composers
People from Leszno County
Polish conductors (music)
Polish male classical composers
Polish music educators
Polish opera composers
Polish Romantic composers
Recipients of the Order of Saint Stanislaus (Congress Poland)